The 1998 season was the sixth season of the J-League. The league began in March and ended in November.
For this year, the division was contested by 18 teams. Júbilo Iwata won the 1st stage and Kashima Antlers won the 2nd stage. Kashima Antlers won the J.League title after winning both matches in the Suntory Championship.

First stage

Second stage

Playoffs

Suntory Championship

Relegation playoffs
On the aggregate table, JEF United Ichihara, Avispa Fukuoka, and Vissel Kobe had earned within the 15th-18th places in the tables for both 1997 and 1998, while Consadole Sapporo had achieved within the same span on its sole season on the J.League. (Gamba Osaka, who had finished between Sapporo and Kobe, was reprieved because of the collapse and resignation of Yokohama Flügels.) These clubs thus were entered in an elimination promotion/relegation tournament along with Japan Football League runners-up Kawasaki Frontale, who unlike champions Tokyo Gas had a base more qualifiable for the J.League.

First round 

Kawasaki forms J.League Division 2 the next season. Fukuoka advances to the next round.

Second round
The winners of this round stay in J.League Division 1 and the losers play a final elimination series to determine the club relegated to Division 2.

Final round

Fukuoka stays in J.League Division 1. Consadole is relegated to new J.League Division 2.

Awards

Individual Awards

Best Eleven

References

J1 League seasons
1
Japan
Japan